Vivian Street is a mostly one-way arterial road in central Wellington, New Zealand. It forms a part of the country's State Highway 1 network. 

Since March 2007, Vivian Street's one-way direction has flowed east-bound, following the completion of the Wellington Inner City Bypass through Te Aro.

Red-light district
The street was part of Wellington's red-light district, particularly in its western half around the junction of Cuba Street, during most of the 20th century. It contained strip joints, peep shows and illegal brothels. During WW1 the area was known as Gallipoli due to the number of soldiers visiting the area. With the decriminalisation of prostitution in the early 21st century, Vivian Street's 'reputation' is undergoing a revival, with the recent opening of Il Bordello Gentlemen's Club, and the reopening of the Liks Bar. Between these two establishments is a live music venue for underground musicians and other emerging artists of New Zealand, Valve Bar.

References

External links 
Wises Map of Vivian Street

Streets in Wellington City
Red-light districts in New Zealand
State Highway 1 (New Zealand)